Society for the Protection of Animal Rights in Egypt, or S.P.A.R.E., is a non-profit animal welfare organization in Egypt. It was founded by Amina Abaza and Dina Zulfikar in 2001. It is the first animal welfare organization in Egypt to address the situation of all animals, including dogs, cats, and donkeys.

Aims
S.P.A.R.E.'s greatest goal and challenge is to eliminate the cruel mentality which allows people to abuse animals. By raising public awareness about animal welfare in Egypt, SPARE works continuously to convince Egyptians that compassion towards animals is not a luxury, it's a must.

In addition to providing kennels, clinics, and spay and neuter operations, SPARE acts as an animal advocacy organization.  It has undertaken causes such as improving conditions at the Cairo zoo, fighting the growth of "private zoos" in Egypt, and improving government standards relating to Egyptian slaughterhouses.

See also 

Animal welfare in Egypt
World Animal Protection
Animal protection
Animal welfare
Animal rights

References

External links
S.P.A.R.E. homepage

2001 establishments in Egypt
Animal welfare organisations based in Egypt
Organizations established in 2001
Organisations based in Cairo